Igor Toporovski is a Belgian art collector. In 2018, more than 20 pieces of Russian avant-garde from his collection made a nucleus of an exhibition at the Ghent Museum of Fine Arts. After an investigation, the pieces were suspected to be forgeries and were taken down for investigation, and Catherine de Zegher, the museum director, was suspended.

At the end of 2019 Igor and his wife Olga were arrested and put in provisional detention at the prison of Ghent awaiting their trial for forgery, money laundering, handling stolen goods and fraud, but in January 2020 they were released, under specific conditions, awaiting their trial. Toporovsky was arrested again after breaching conditions.

References

Belgian art collectors
Living people
Year of birth missing (living people)